The Eugenio Lopez Junior Communications Center (also called 9501, ELJ Communications Center, or simply ELJ Center) is the headquarters of the media conglomerate ABS-CBN Corporation and its subsidiaries, and the television network of the same name. It is located at ABS-CBN Broadcasting Center Compound in Diliman, Quezon City, Philippines. The center occupies ten thousand (10,000) square meters of land area adjacent to the ABS-CBN Broadcasting Center and houses corporate offices, a studios, a three-level basement parking, a roof deck helipad, a film archive, a studio gallery, an exclusive executive dining restaurant, and garden. The center has a gross floor area of 101,608.32 square meters; almost seventy thousand (70,000) square meters of office space and over thirty thousand (30,000) square meters of parking space. The construction of the center, which costed 6 billion pesos, began in 1995, but was delayed due to the Asian Financial Crisis in 1997. It was opened in 2000, and was occupied gradually by ABS-CBN subsidiaries in the following years. It is a PEZA Special Economic Zone, designated as an IT center. It is named in honor of the late Eugenio Lopez Jr., the chairman emeritus of ABS-CBN. The dedication of the building was held on November 4, 2010, in a ceremony that was attended by the then-Philippine President Benigno Aquino III. ABS-CBN's Horizon PEZA IT Park, its soundstages, post-production and production facility of ABS-CBN is located at San Jose del Monte, Bulacan.

Structures

Offices
The offices of ELJ Communications Center are composed of two interconnecting building structures. These are the three thousand square meter (3,000), fifteen-storey and the two thousand square meter (2,000), twelve-storey buildings joint together by steel and glass structures.

The ground floor level is a mixed-use commercial area called The Loop, which is home to the several retail shops, dining outlets, and a studio called The Loop Studio which is being used by the morning news and talk show Umagang Kay Ganda. A studio gallery, an executive lobby, and the main reception area are also located on its ground floor. Located on its second floor is the offices of Star Cinema and the network's human resources division, dressing and rehearsal rooms, and the hallway leading to the network's studios and technical rooms. The network's corporate offices are housed from the building's third to twelfth floors, with several floors being leased to some of ABS-CBN's subsidiaries. ABS-CBN Post Production unit, iPost, is housed in the third floor, while the network's legal department, corporate communications, licensing, and media asset management (Big Dipper) are located on the fourth floor. ABS-CBN Sports, tax accounting, and human resources could be visited at the fifth floor. Sky Cable is housed in the sixth floor. The eighth floor is the home of their Information Technology division, Creative Programs Inc., and ABS-CBN Publishing, while ABS-CBN Global and Digital Media Division could be found on the ninth floor. The thirteenth floor houses the conference center, while Restaurant 9501, the executive dining restaurant of ABS-CBN is located on the fourteenth floor of the building. Meanwhile, executive offices are located on the building's fifteenth floor. ABS-CBN Film Archives, the film archives of ABS-CBN which holds the biggest film collection in the country, and a parking area located in the three basement levels of the building. In 2013, the whole center became one of the first 4G LTE zone in the country after Globe and Sun Cellular upgraded their respective transmitters inside the complex.

ABS-CBN's wholly owned subsidiary, The Big Dipper Digital Content & Design, Inc. (Big Dipper), with offices located on the center's fourth floor, is an approved economic zone enterprise of PEZA, making the company eligible for tax holiday and other incentives. In 2010, the company has availed an income tax holiday incentives of 472 million pesos. In 2011 and 2012, the company has availed 188 million and 204 million pesos respectively. In 2014, PEZA approved the application of Big Dipper for the entitlement of the Pioneer Status.

Studios
Studios in the ELJ building are housed in a four storey high, 3,000 square meter structure. It is connected with the rest of the center and is further divided into three studios. Studio 10, the largest studio of ABS-CBN, is used by the musical variety show ASAP. Studio 9, is used by the morning talk show, Magandang Buhay and Studio 8 is a temporary studio set-up, where the props and set decorations are dismantled after the show. An elephant door is located in the studios that leads to the ABS-CBN Broadcasting Center.

The west wing of the center

The east wing of the center

References

ABS-CBN Corporation
Mass media company headquarters in the Philippines
Office buildings in Metro Manila
Office buildings completed in 2000
Television studios in the Philippines
Buildings and structures in Quezon City
Assets owned by ABS-CBN Corporation
PEZA Special Economic Zones
Special economic zones
ABS-CBN
20th-century architecture in the Philippines